Events from the year 1504 in art.

Events
January 25 – A committee of artists and citizens of Florence, including Leonardo da Vinci, Sandro Botticelli, Cosimo Rosselli and Piero di Cosimo, meets to decide on the placement of Michelangelo's marble statue of David.
September 8 – Michelangelo's David is unveiled in Florence.
 The Signoria of Florence commissions both Michelangelo and Leonardo da Vinci to paint the walls of the Grand Council Chamber in the Palazzo della Signoria.

Works

Sculpture

Michelangelo
David
Pitti Tondo (marble bas-relief)

Graphic art
Jacopo de' Barbari – Still life with Partridge and Gauntlets
Fra Bartolomeo – The Vision of St. Bernard with Sts. Benedict and John the Evangelist (approximate date)
Hieronymus Bosch – The Garden of Earthly Delights (triptych; approximate date)
Cima da Conegliano - Madonna and Child
Lucas Cranach the Elder – The Rest on the Flight to Egypt
Albrecht Dürer
Adoration of the Magi
Joachim and Anne Meeting at the Golden Gate (woodcut)
Giorgione (approximate date)
Castelfranco Madonna
Judith
Leonardo da Vinci – The Battle of Anghiari
Pietro Perugino – Marriage of the Virgin
Raphael
Portrait of Pietro Bembo
Marriage of the Virgin
St. George
Vision of a Knight
The Seven Works of Mercy (Master of Alkmaar)

Publications
Pomponius Gauricus - De sculptura

Births
April 30 – Francesco Primaticcio, Bolognese painter, architect, and sculptor (died 1570)
date unknown
 Camillo Boccaccino, Italian painter active mainly in Cremona and regions of Lombardy (died 1546)
 Juan Vicente Macip (or Vicente Joanes Masip or Macip), Spanish painter, head of the Valencian school of painters (died 1579)
 Shin Saimdang, Korean genre works painter and calligraphist (died 1551)
 Sesson Shukei, Japanese Zen monk and painter from the Muromachi period (died 1589)
probable - Marco d'Agrate, Italian sculptor (died 1574)

Deaths
April 15 – Filippino Lippi, Tuscan painter (born 1457)
date unknown
Pedro Berruguete, Spanish painter (born 1450)
Gian Giacomo Dolcebuono, Italian architect and sculptor (born 1445)
Matteo Lappoli, Italian painter (born 1450)
Antonio Rinaldeschi, Italian gambler, executed for throwing dung at a painting of the Virgin Mary above the doorway of the church of Santa Maria degli Alberghi in Florence (born unknown)
Master I. A. M. of Zwolle, anonymous Dutch goldsmith and engraver (born 1440)

References

 
Years of the 16th century in art
1500s in art